Richard Earl Davis (born February 6, 1938) is a former American football defensive end who played one season with the Dallas Texans of the American Football League (AFL). He first enrolled at Vanderbilt University before transferring to the University of Kansas. Davis attended Messick High School in Memphis, Tennessee. He was a member of the Texans team that won the 1962 AFL championship.

References

External links
Just Sports Stats
Fanbase profile

Living people
1938 births
Players of American football from Tennessee
American football defensive ends
Vanderbilt Commodores football players
Kansas Jayhawks football players
Dallas Texans (AFL) players
People from Jackson, Tennessee